John Winthrop Chanler (September 14, 1826 – October 19, 1877) was a prominent New York lawyer and a U.S. Representative from New York. He was a member of the Dudley–Winthrop family and married Margaret Astor Ward, a member of the Astor family.

Early life

John Winthrop Chanler was born in New York City on September 14, 1826, the only son of the Rev. Dr. John White Chanler, an Episcopalian clergyman from Charleston, South Carolina, and Elizabeth Shirreff Winthrop.  His mother was a great-great-granddaughter of Wait Winthrop and Joseph Dudley and a great-great-great granddaughter of Peter Stuyvesant.

Chanler received his early education from private tutors, and graduated from Columbia College of Columbia University in 1847. He attended the University of Heidelberg, studied law, and was admitted to the New York State Bar in 1851.

Career
A Democrat affiliated with Tammany Hall, Chanler was member of the New York State Assembly (New York Co., 10th D.) in 1858 and 1859. He was nominated for New York State Senate in 1860 but declined.  He was an unsuccessful candidate for election in 1860 to the Thirty-seventh Congress, losing to the Mozart Hall Democrats.

United States Congress

Chanler was elected as a Democrat to the Thirty-eighth, Thirty-ninth, and Fortieth United States Congresses, serving from March 4, 1863 to March 3, 1869.

While in Congress, Chanler served on the Committee of Bankrupt Law, Committee on Patents, Committee on Southern Railroads.

He was known for his censure on May 14, 1866 for an insult to the House of Representatives. The censure stemmed from a resolution he introduced expressing support for the vetoes of President Andrew Johnson, in which Chanler called acts of Congress vetoed by Johnson "wicked and revolutionary," and called House members who overruled the vetoes "malignant and mischievous."

He was defeated in his reelection to the 41st Congress for his hostility to Boss Tweed.

Later career
After Tweed was overthrown from running Tammany Hall in 1871, Chanler became a Sachem and Chairman of the General Committee.  He ultimately gave up the positions in 1875 due to his declining health.

Family

In 1862, Chanler married Margaret Astor "Maddie" Ward, whose parents were Samuel Cutler Ward and Emily Astor of the Astor family. She was also a granddaughter of Samuel Ward III and William Backhouse Astor Sr. as well as a great-granddaughter of Samuel Ward Jr., John Jacob Astor, and John Armstrong Jr. Together, John and Margaret had eleven children:

 John Armstrong "Archie" Chanler (1862–1935), who married and later divorced novelist Amélie Rives Troubetzkoy (1863–1945).
 Winthrop Astor "Wintie" Chanler (1863–1926), who married Margaret Louisa "Daisy" Terry (1862–1952) in 1886.
 Emily Astor Chanler (1864–1872) who died of scarlet fever
 Elizabeth Astor Winthrop Chanler (1866–1937), who married John Jay Chapman (1862–1933) in 1899.
 William Astor "Willie" Chanler (1867–1934), a politician, soldier, and explorer who married Beatrice "Minnie" Ashley (1878–1946)
 Marion Ward Chanler (1868–1883)
 Lewis Stuyvesant Chanler (1869–1942), a politician who married Alice Chamberlain (1868–1955) in 1890. After their divorce, he married Julia Lynch Olin (1882–1961) in 1921.
 Margaret Livingston Chanler (1870–1963), who served as a nurse with the American Red Cross during the Spanish–American War and who married Richard Aldrich (1863–1937) in 1906.
 Robert Winthrop Chanler (1872–1930), an artist who married Julia Remington (1872–1936). After their divorce in 1907, he married Natalina "Lina" Cavalieri (1874–1944)
 Alida Beekman Chanler (1873–1969), who married Christopher Temple Emmet (1868–1957).
 Egerton White Chanler (1874–1882), who died of a brain tumor

Margaret died of pneumonia in December 1875 shortly after attending the funeral of William Backhouse Astor Sr. She was buried at Trinity Church Cemetery in New York City. In her will, she left $55,000 (equivalent to $ in  dollars) to her husband, $1,000 (equivalent to $ in  dollars) a year to her father, and the rest to be divided among her children.

Death and burial
John Winthrop Chanler died at his "Rokeby" estate in Barrytown, New York, also of pneumonia, on October 19, 1877.  His funeral was attended by New York Mayor Smith Ely Jr., Hamilton Fish, William Backhouse Astor Jr., John Jacob Astor III, John Reilly, John Kean, Van Horn Stuyvesant, Dr. Austin Flint, and Hamilton Fish, Jr.   His pallbearers were Smith Ely, George Warren Dresser, Sidney Webster, Tompkins Westervelt, Carlile Pollock Patterson, Frederic W. Rhinelander, John W. Ehrlinger, and Walter Langdon.  He was interred with his wife in the Trinity Church Cemetery in New York City.

Estate
According to John Winthrop Chanler's will, his estate was valued between $1,500,000 (equivalent to $) and $2,000,000 (equivalent to $ in  dollars).  The executors were Lewis Morris Rutherfurd, Franklin Hughes Delano, Rutherfurd Stuyvesant, and Tompkins Westervelt.  His eldest son, John Armstrong, inherited Rokeby with all its stock, books, pictures, furniture, and personal property of all kinds, $100,000 (equivalent to $ in  dollars) on reaching the age of majority, all of his real estate in Dutchess County, and a lot of land in Newport, Rhode Island known as "Cliff Lawn."  To Winthrop Astor, he left all the personal property in his New York City home, located at 192 Madison Avenue, all of his real estate in Delaware County, and a house on Cliff Lawn in Newport.  To his daughters, Elizabeth, Margaret, and Alida, he gave all of their mother's jewelry, and a lot in Newport for each of them, as well as to his sons William Astor, Marion Ward, Lewis Stuyvesant, Robert Winthrop, and Egerton White.  In addition, the will provided $20,000 (equivalent to $ in  dollars) a year for each child for life, enough to live comfortably by the standards of the time.

See also
List of United States representatives expelled, censured, or reprimanded

References

External links 

|-

19th-century American politicians
1826 births
1877 deaths
American expatriates in Germany
John Winthrop
Astor Orphans
John Winthrop
Burials at Trinity Church Cemetery
Censured or reprimanded members of the United States House of Representatives
Chanler family
Columbia College (New York) alumni
Democratic Party members of the United States House of Representatives from New York (state)
Heidelberg University alumni
Lawyers from New York City
John Winthrop
Democratic Party members of the New York State Assembly
New York (state) lawyers
People from Barrytown, New York
People of New York (state) in the American Civil War
Politicians from New York City
John Winthrop
Winthrop family